LoVecchio is a surname. Notable people with the surname include:

Frankie Laine (born Francesco LoVecchio, 1913–2007), American singer, songwriter, and actor
Jeff LoVecchio (born 1985), American ice hockey player
Matt LoVecchio (born 1982), American football player

See also
Andrea Lo Vecchio